Nicole Andrews is an American actress who has appeared in numerous commercials, television shows and films.  She has appeared on such television shows as How I Met Your Mother, $#*! My Dad Says, and Drake & Josh and in movies such as Lovelace, Homefront, Grudge Match and Leatherface.

References

External links
 

Actresses from San Diego
Living people
Year of birth missing (living people)
21st-century American women